Paris–Camembert (also Paris–Camembert Trophée Lepetit or Paris–Camembert Lepetit) is a semi classic held annually in April. Since 2005, the race is organized as a 1.1 event on the UCI Europe Tour. The route of the  race has varied over the years, it previously started in Magnanville, near Paris, and finished in Vimoutiers.

The present day race starts in Pont-Audemer in the Eure department and heads south for 60 km to the environs of the finishing town of Livarot in the Calvados department. Once in the region of Livarot the race takes in seven climbs around the town, some of which are ascended several times. The climbs are namely: Côte de Chevreville-Tonnencourt (one ascent), Côte de l'Angleterre (three ascents), Butte des Fondits (three ascents), Côte de Camembert (one ascent), Côte de la Cavée de Crouttes (two ascents), Côte de Tortisambert (two ascents) and the Côte de la Becquetiere (two ascents). The last of these 14 climbs is 10 km from the finish line which is in the town centre of Livarot on the Route de Lisieux. Historically, the race attracted a mostly French field of riders, but the field has become increasingly more diverse. By the 1970s famous riders were regularly participating and sometimes winning the race: riders such as Bernard Hinault and Joop Zoetemelk added celebrity and allure to the race. Teams based in France most heavily contest the race, but the race today also draws UCI ProTour teams. Some riders also use the race in preparation for the Ardennes classics.

Winners

References

External links
Official site 

Recurring sporting events established in 1934
1934 establishments in France
UCI Europe Tour races
Cycle races in France